Searcy Municipal Airport  is a city-owned public-use airport located three nautical miles (4 mi, 6 km) south of the central business district of Searcy, in White County, Arkansas, United States.

This airport is included in the FAA's National Plan of Integrated Airport Systems for 2019–2023, which categorized it as a general aviation facility.

Facilities and aircraft 
Searcy Municipal Airport covers an area of 330 acres (134 ha) at an elevation of 265 feet (81 m) above mean sea level. It has one runway designated 1/19 with an asphalt surface measuring 6,008 by 100 feet (1,831 x 30 m).

For the 12-month period ending July 31, 2020, the airport had 31,560 aircraft operations, an average of 86 per day: 95% general aviation, 3% air taxi and 2% military. In December 2020, there were 101 aircraft based at this airport: 79 single-engine, 12 multi-engine, 3 jet and 7 helicopter.

References

External links 
 Searcy Municipal Airport at City of Searcy website
 Aerial image as of 28 February 2001 from USGS The National Map
 

Airports in Arkansas
Transportation in White County, Arkansas